The Steel City Cup is a greyhound racing competition held annually at Owlerton Stadium in Sheffield. 

It was inaugurated in 1970.

Past winners

Venues & Distances
1970-present (Sheffield 500m)

Sponsors
1994–2009 (William Hill)
2010–2010 (Betfair)
2011–2017 (Betfred)
2018–2018 (Greyhound Media Group)
2019–2019 (Racing Post Greyhound TV)
2021–2022 (BresBet)

References

Greyhound racing competitions in the United Kingdom
Sports competitions in Sheffield
Sport in Sheffield
Recurring sporting events established in 1970